59th New York Film Critics Circle Awards
January 16, 1994

Best Picture:
 Schindler's List 
The 59th New York Film Critics Circle Awards honored the best filmmaking of 1993. The winners were announced on 15 December 1993 and the awards were given on 16 January 1994.

Winners
Best Actor:
David Thewlis - Naked
Runners-up: Anthony Hopkins - The Remains of the Day and Shadowlands and Daniel Day-Lewis - In the Name of the Father
Best Actress:
Holly Hunter - The Piano
Runners-up: Ashley Judd - Ruby in Paradise and Emma Thompson - The Remains of the Day
Best Cinematography:
Janusz Kamiński - Schindler's List
Runners-up: Michael Ballhaus - The Age of Innocence and Stuart Dryburgh - The Piano
Best Director:
Jane Campion - The Piano
Runners-up: Steven Spielberg - Schindler's List and Mike Leigh - Naked
Best Documentary:
Visions of Light
Runners-up: The War Room and Rock Hudson's Home Movies
Best Film:
Schindler's List
Runners-up: The Piano and Naked
Best Foreign Language Film:
Farewell My Concubine (Ba wang bie ji) • China/Hong Kong
Runners-up: The Story of Qiu Ju (Qiu Ju da guan si) • China and Highway Patrolman (El patrullero) • Mexico
Best Screenplay:
Jane Campion - The Piano
Runners-up: Steven Zaillian - Schindler's List and Danny Rubin and Harold Ramis - Groundhog Day
Best Supporting Actor:
Ralph Fiennes - Schindler's List
Runners-up: Leonardo DiCaprio - What's Eating Gilbert Grape and This Boy's Life and John Malkovich - In the Line of Fire
Best Supporting Actress:
Gong Li - Farewell My Concubine (Ba wang bie ji)
Runners-up: Rosie Perez - Fearless and Untamed Heart and Jennifer Jason Leigh - Short Cuts

References

External links
1993 Awards

1993
1993 film awards
1993 in American cinema
December 1993 events in the United States
1993 awards in the United States
1993 in New York City